The 1955 Montana State Bobcats football team was an American football team that represented Montana State University in the Rocky Mountain Conference (RMC) during the 1955 college football season. In its first and only season under head coach Wally Lemm, the team compiled a 4–4–1 record (3–2–1 against conference opponents) and finished third out of six teams in the RMC.

Schedule

References

Montana State
Montana State Bobcats football seasons
Montana State Bobcats football